Yulia Kornievets is a Ukrainian footballer who plays as a striker. She previously played in Russia for Zorky Krasnogorsk and Mordovochka Saransk, and in Ukraine for Lehenda Chernihiv, with which she has also played the European Cup. She is a member of the Ukrainian national team.

Club career
Kornievets played in the Spanish Primera División for Sporting de Huelva between 2018 and 2019.

References

1986 births
Living people
Footballers from Chernihiv
Ukrainian women's footballers
Ukrainian women's futsal players
Expatriate women's footballers in Spain
Ukraine women's international footballers
WFC Lehenda-ShVSM Chernihiv players
WFC Yednist Plysky players
Expatriate women's footballers in Russia
FC Zorky Krasnogorsk (women) players
Zvezda 2005 Perm players
Sporting de Huelva players
Ukrainian expatriate women's footballers
Ukrainian expatriate sportspeople in Russia
Ukrainian expatriate sportspeople in Spain
Women's association football forwards